La Milla de Oro (English for the golden mile) is both the popular name given to the main central business district of San Juan and a nickname given to the section of Juan Ponce de León Avenue that crosses Hato Rey Norte from north to south. It encompasses the largest agglomeration of corporate investment, banking and finance institutions in the Caribbean. The headquarters of Puerto Rico's largest retail investment bank, Popular, Inc., are located at Popular Center in 208 Juan Ponce de León Ave. La Milla de Oro is served by the Tren Urbano stations of Hato Rey, Roosevelt, Domenech and Piñero stations in addition to numerous bus routes with connections to Río Piedras, Plaza Las Américas, Santurce and Old San Juan.

List of buildings at La Milla de Oro

 Popular, Inc. headquarters (3 buildings)
 AFI Plaza (Seaborne Airlines Plaza) (formerly Westernbank World Plaza, the Banco de Ponce headquarters); acquired by Banco Popular de Puerto Rico after an FDIC closure of several banks on the Island in 2010.
 Kevane Grant Thornton Building (formerly known as Bolivia 33)
 The Hato Rey Center (formerly known as Home Mortgage Plaza)
 Banco Santander building
 Plaza 273 (formerly known as Plaza Scotiabank)
 Plaza 221 (formerly known as Banco Economias, Banco Central Hispano and then Banco Santander)
 American International Group (AIG) building
 MCS Plaza (Formerly Pan-Am Plaza)
 Puerto Rico Comptroller’s Office building
 City of San Juan government tower
 AON Center
 City Towers (formerly known as Citibank Tower)
 Centrum Plaza
 Puerto Rico Department of Labor and Human Resources (Departamento del Trabajo y Recursos Humanos) building
 José Miguel Agrelot Coliseum (Coliseo de Puerto Rico)
 OFG Bancorp Center (formerly Chase Manhattan Bank Plaza and BBVA Plaza)
 Tren Urbano Hato Rey station
 Tren Urbano Roosevelt station
 Aquablue at the Golden Mile
 Quantum Metrocenter, designed by SCF Arquitectos and built in 2012
 Uruguay 269 (under construction)
 Coliseum Tower (completed)
 Metropolis (under construction)
 Infinity (under Construction)
 Torre Mayor 
 Instituto Socio Economico Comunitario (www.insec.org)
 Fine Arts Cafe (an upscale Repertory Theatre owned by Caribbean Cinemas)
 Fi Sigma Alfa Fraternity Club House (Restaurant and activities hall)

Plans

Milla de Oro has received criticism from nearby communities for its lonely and dark environment after work hours. In order to foster tourism and economic growth in the area, the government has planned to convert the district into a more community friendly sector by attracting tourists, visitors, and local residents to the district during after hours through concerts, retail shops, and nightspots.

The first phase of this conversion was to locate the José Miguel Agrelot Coliseum and several Tren Urbano metro system stations in the district. Banco Popular recently inaugurated a new project near its headquarters called Arts Cinemas at Popular Center for exhibiting foreign and independent films and a deli-café. New residential apartments and a 31-story high commercial complex near the Coliseum are being developed in the area as well.

Milla de Oro in popular culture
The Milla de Oro was heavily featured in the Calle 13 2010 musical video for "Calma Pueblo". The song features lead singer, Residente, singing on top of a building while businessmen and random people run around the Milla de Oro, eventually getting naked.

The Milla de Oro was also featured in the film Fast Five during one of the heists.

References

Financial districts
Districts of San Juan, Puerto Rico
Central business districts in the United States
Economy of Puerto Rico